Brousse (French appellation from Provençal brousso; corsican brócciu) is a white and lumpy whey cheese from Provence, Corsica and north-western Italy. It is mostly made of whey from cow, sheep or goat milk.

Consumption 
Brousse can be eaten as it is, or in savoury or sweet preparations. It can be seasoned with sugar, honey, jam, fines herbes or  orange blossom, or dressed with red fruits coulis or maple syrup.

See also
 List of Italian cheeses
 List of cheeses

Notes 

Whey cheeses